A list of films released in Finland ordered by year of release. For an alphabetical list of Finnish films see :Category:Finnish films

References

External links
 Finnish film at the Internet Movie Database

2020s
Films
Finland